Myiomyrmica fenestrata is a species of ulidiid or picture-winged fly in the genus Cephalia of the family Ulidiidae.

Distribution
United States.

References

Ulidiidae
Diptera of North America
Taxa named by Daniel William Coquillett
Insects described in 1900